The Hub is a major commercial center for the South Bronx, New York. It is located where four roads converge: East 149th Street, and Willis, Melrose and Third Avenues. It is primarily located inside the neighborhood of Melrose but also lines the northern border of Mott Haven.

The Hub, short for "the Hub of the Bronx," has also been called "the Broadway of the Bronx". It is the site of both maximum traffic and architectural density. In configuration, it resembles a miniature Times Square, a spatial "bow-tie" created by the geometry of the street intersections. It is a primary shopping district for Bronx residents, and many new hip hop trends can be found in the Hub long before they spread to the rest of New York City and the world.

The area is part of Bronx Community Board 1.

History

The Hub is the oldest major shopping locale in the Bronx. Between 1900 and 1930, the number of Bronx residents increased from 201,000 to 1,265,000. Inhabitants throughout the borough shopped in department stores and boutiques at 149th Street and 3rd Avenue, an area that came to be known in this time as "the Hub". In the 1930s the Hub had movie palaces and vaudeville theaters. These included the Bronx Opera House, which today operates as a boutique hotel, and the former Jackson Theatre.

A few decades after it became a national symbol of urban decay, the South Bronx is now home to several new construction projects that are rebuilding neighborhoods that have seen little new construction in half a century. On March 14, 2006, Mayor Michael Bloomberg and other elected officials took part in the symbolic groundbreaking ceremony for the new "Hub Retail and Office Center". After a year and a half of construction, the Hub Retail and Office Center opened in the middle of 2007. Current tenants include Staples, Rite Aid, and Forman Mills, a clothing store opening its first New York store in the Bronx. Upcoming tenants include Nine West and Sleepy's. As a result, the Hub's district is extended to East 156th Street in Melrose.

Shopping traffic in the Hub is generated via foot, car, and public transportation. Sidewalks in the Hub are often crowded. Merchants hawk their wares by calling out to the crowd or passing out small handbills. Music stores offer a wide selection of hip-hop, reggae, gospel, and Latin music. Craft stores have knitting and sewing supplies. Local mom-and-pop stores compete with major chains, such as Carter's and Foot Locker.

Triangle Plaza Hub
A new complex with mixed-use office and retail space opened in the summer of 2016. As of 2016, notable tenants of the complex include Fine Fare Supermarket, a DaVita dialysis clinic, a Boston Market, and a Dunkin' Donuts.

Transportation

The Hub, located at the junction of four major thoroughfares, is well served by public transport.

The following MTA Regional Bus Operations bus routes serve the Hub:
Bx2: to Riverdale (AM hours & Sundays Only), Kingsbridge Heights or Third Avenue–138th Street station (via Grand Concourse) all other times
Bx4: to Westchester Square (via Westchester Avenue)
Bx15: to Fordham Plaza (via Third Avenue)
Bx19: to New York Botanical Garden or Riverbank State Park (via 149th Street–Southern Boulevard)
Bx21: Westchester Square or Third Avenue–138th Street station (via Boston Road)
Bx32: to VA Hospital or Third Avenue–138th Street station (via Morris-Jerome Avenues)
Bx41 and Bx41 SBS: to Williamsbridge, Gun Hill Road (via Webster Avenue)
M125: to Manhattanville (via 125th Street)

The following New York City Subway stations serve the Hub:
Third Avenue–149th Street subway station on the IRT White Plains Road Line

The Hub does not  have a nearby Metro-North Railroad station, but the Melrose station is a few blocks north at 162nd Street and Park Avenue. In 1902 a large Grand Union Station was proposed near the now-closed 138th Street station, half a mile from the Hub, which would have been served by many of the railroads entering Manhattan at the time. However, this was never built.

The 149th Street station on the IRT Third Avenue Line operated from 1887 to 1973. The confluence of the since-demolished IRT Third Avenue Line and IRT White Plains Road Line contributed to the Hub's growth.

References

External links

THE HUB, BUB. A walk in the South Bronx
The Hub 3rd Avenue BID
Opera House Hotel

Neighborhoods in the Bronx
Third Avenue